The following low-power television stations broadcast on digital or analog channel 11 in the United States:

 K10OA-D in Terrace Lakes, Idaho
 K11AT-D in Gunnison, Colorado
 K11BD-D in Leadore, Idaho
 K11BM-D in Methow, Washington
 K11BX-D in Sutherlin, Oregon
 K11CN-D in Caliente, Nevada
 K11CP-D in Fish Creek, Idaho
 K11CQ-D in Cedar City, Utah
 K11CS-D in Rock Island, Washington
 K11DL-D in Juliaetta, Idaho
 K11ED-D in Ruth, Nevada
 K11EE-D in Ely & McGill, Nevada
 K11EV-D in Grants, etc., New Mexico
 K11EZ-D in Cashmere, Washington
 K11FF-D in Superior, Montana
 K11FJ-D in Squilchuck St. Park, Washington
 K11FQ-D in Thompson Falls, Montana
 K11GH-D in Tri Cities, etc., Oregon
 K11GT-D in Eugene, Oregon
 K11GX-D in Whitewater, Montana
 K11HM-D in Bonners Ferry, Idaho
 K11HO-D in Polson, Montana
 K11IA-D in Glasgow, Montana
 K11IH-D in Malta, Montana
 K11IL-D in Bitterroot Range, etc., Montana
 K11IV-D in Pioche, Nevada
 K11IY-D in Battle Mountain, Nevada
 K11JP-D in Plains-Paradise, Montana
 K11KE-D in Woods Bay, Montana
 K11KI-D in Dorena, etc., Oregon
 K11KO-D in Kamiah, Idaho
 K11KP-D in Troy, Montana
 K11LA-D in Basin, Montana
 K11LC-D in Prescott, Arizona
 K11LM-D in Thomasville, Colorado
 K11LP-D in Cortez, Colorado
 K11MP-D in White Sulphur Springs, Montana
 K11OO-D in Pine Valley, etc., Utah
 K11OW-D in Ursine, Nevada
 K11PB-D in Cambridge, Idaho
 K11PP-D in Dingle, etc., Idaho
 K11PS-D in Collbran, Colorado
 K11QE-D in Skagway, Alaska
 K11QG-D in Toksook Bay, Alaska
 K11QI-D in Ambler, Alaska
 K11QQ-D in Hildale, etc., Utah
 K11QY-D in Kwethluk, Alaska
 K11RN-D in Douglas, Wyoming
 K11RX-D in Big Arm, Montana
 K11SZ-D in Oakridge, Oregon
 K11TJ-D in Sargents, Colorado
 K11TY-D in Salmon, Idaho
 K11UN-D in Coolin, Idaho
 K11UU-D in Pago Pago, American Samoa
 K11UW-D in Akron, Colorado
 K11VI-D in Elkton, Oregon
 K11VY-D in Toquerville, Utah
 K11WF-D in Mink Creek, Idaho
 K11WJ in Paris, Texas
 K11WK-D in Stanford, Montana
 K11WM-D in Townsend, Montana
 K11WQ-D in West Knees, Montana
 K11WR-D in Council, Idaho
 K11WT-D in McCall, Idaho
 K11WY-D in Coulee City, Washington
 K11WZ-D in Delta Junction, etc., Alaska
 K11XC-D in Salina & Redmond, Utah
 K11XD-D in Rural Juab, etc., Utah
 K11XE-D in Marysvale, Utah
 K11XF-D in Woodland, Utah
 K11XG-D in Logan, Utah
 K11XI-D in Beaver etc., Utah
 K11XK-D in Helper, Utah
 K11XL-D in Roosevelt, etc., Utah
 K11XM-D in East Price, Utah
 K11XP-D in Boise, Idaho
 K11XU-D in El Centro, California
 K21KJ-D in Mineral Wells, Texas
 K38AJ-D in Blanding/Monticello, Utah
 K41LC-D in Long Valley Junction, Utah
 KIIT-CA in North Platte, Nebraska
 KJST-LD in McAllen, Texas
 KKRM-LD in Chico, California
 KPJC-LD in San Francisco, California
 KSBK-LD in Colorado Springs, Colorado
 KTEQ-LP in Fulton, Arkansas
 KTVF in Fairbanks, Alaska
 KUVN-CD in Fort Worth, Texas
 KVHC-LD in Kerrville, Texas
 KWTC-LD in Kerrville, Texas
 KWVT-LD in Salem, Oregon
 W11AJ-D in Franklin, North Carolina
 W11AN-D in Bryson City, North Carolina
 W11DH-D in Wabasso, Florida
 W11DM-D in Collegedale, Tennessee
 W11DR-D in Wilmington, North Carolina
 WDFL-LD in Miami, Florida
 WDNZ-LD in Glasgow, Kentucky
 WJDP-LD in Pigeon Forge, Tennessee
 WJKF-CD in Jacksonville, Florida
 WNIB-LD in Rochester, New York
 WOPI-CD in Bristol, Virginia/Kingsport, Tennessee
 WPNY-LD in Utica, etc., New York
 WTNC-LD in Durham, North Carolina
 WTZT-CD in Athens, Alabama
 WUEO-LD in Macon, Georgia
 WVTT-CD in Olean, New York
 WYCH-LD in Rockford, Illinois

The following low-power stations, which are no longer licensed, formerly broadcast on analog or digital channel 11:
 K11BC in Grace, etc., Idaho
 K11BI-D in Entiat, Washington
 K11BJ in White Bird, Idaho
 K11BV in Helper, Utah
 K11CB in Forsyth, Montana
 K11CC in Checkerboard, Montana
 K11CR in Ferdinand, Idaho
 K11CX in Beaver, etc., Utah
 K11DD in Green River, Utah
 K11DF in Vernal, etc., Utah
 K11FP in Manti, etc., Utah
 K11GO in Happy Camp, etc., California
 K11HE in Jordan, etc., Montana
 K11HS in Bridgeport, etc., California
 K11JO in Bloomfield, etc., New Mexico
 K11KR in Naknek, Alaska
 K11KU in Salida, etc., Colorado
 K11KW in Ainsworth, Nebraska
 K11LD in Likely, California
 K11LZ in Caineville, Utah
 K11MB in Lavina, Montana
 K11MF in Quartz Creek, etc., Montana
 K11MK in Vale, Oregon
 K11ML in Ridgecrest, etc., California
 K11MU-D in Paradise Valley, Nevada
 K11NA in Hatch, Utah
 K11ND in Hanna, etc., Utah
 K11NE in Hoopa, California
 K11NN in Barrow, Alaska
 K11NP in Garrison, etc., Utah
 K11NV in Guadalupita, New Mexico
 K11OJ in Sedalia, etc., Missouri
 K11OP in Virgin, Utah
 K11QN-D in Aniak, Alaska
 K11QV in Paxson, Alaska
 K11QW in Ekwok, Alaska
 K11QZ in Metlakatla, Alaska
 K11RA in Klawock, Alaska
 K11RC in Thorne Bay, Alaska
 K11RG in Gakona, Alaska
 K11RJ in Lake Louise, etc., Alaska
 K11RM in Silver Lake, etc., Oregon
 K11RQ-D in Chignik Lake, Alaska
 K11RV in Telida, Alaska
 K11SB in Russian Mission, Alaska
 K11SD in Eek, Alaska
 K11SX in Samak, Utah
 K11TD in Hopland, California
 K11TG in Fish Lake Resort, Utah
 K11TH in Nome, Alaska
 K11TL in Utahn, Utah
 K11UJ in Bozeman, Montana
 K11VB in Orovada, Nevada
 K11VP-D in Homer-Seldovia, Alaska
 K11VR in Montezuma Creek & Aneth, Utah
 K11VU in Bluff & area, Utah
 K11WD in Mexican Hat, Utah
 K11WE in Tonopah, Nevada
 K11XT-D in Mariposa, California
 KMHZ-LP in San Antonio, Texas
 KPBN-LP in Baton Rouge, Louisiana
 KQUX-LP in Austin, Texas
 KSPG-LP in Carrizo Springs, Texas
 KUBD-LP in Kodiak, Alaska
 KUOK-CA in Norman, Oklahoma
 KXMN-LP in Spokane, etc., Washington
 W11AQ in Robbinsville, etc., North Carolina
 W11AX in Bat Cave, etc., North Carolina
 W11AY-D in St John Plantation, Maine
 W11CZ in Escanaba, Michigan
 WAKN-LP in Akron, Ohio
 WETV-CD in Murfreesboro, Tennessee
 WJFB-LP in Lebanon, Tennessee
 WMTO-LD in Manteo, North Carolina
 WMYG-LP in Lake City, Florida

References

11 low-power